Surge means a sudden transient rush or flood, and may refer to:

Science

 Storm surge, the onshore gush of water associated with a low-pressure weather system
 Surge (glacier), a short-lived event where a glacier can move up to velocities 100 times faster than normal
 Pyroclastic surge, the fluidised mass of turbulent gas and rock fragments ejected during some volcanic eruptions
 Characteristic impedance, also known as "surge impedance" in electrical engineering
 Voltage surge, short duration surges in electrical circuits
 Compressor stall, also known as "compressor surge", in aviation 
 Surge in compressors in industrial compressors
 Hydraulic surge in liquid pipes; also called pressure surge and water hammer (see surge control)
 Surge (translational motion), one of the translational degrees of freedom of any stiff body (for example a vehicle), describing motion along the longitudinal axis (forward or backwards)
 Surge (waves), transient or periodic motion in the direction of propagation, specially of a breaking wave or surf

Popular culture
 Surge (soft drink), a soft drink made by the Coca-Cola Company
 Surge, a video game publishing label owned by Namco Bandai Games
 Surge (radio station), the student radio station of the University of Southampton
 Surge (Marvel Comics), a comic book character and mutant in the Marvel Universe
 Surge, a 2016 book written by Mike Michalowicz
 Surge: Side A, a 2017 multimedia performance piece by Jay Bernard
 Surge, a 2019 poetry collection by Jay Bernard
 Surge (2020 British film), a film starring Ben Whishaw
 Surge (2020 American film), a television documentary film
 Lt. Surge, a gym Leader in the Pokémon video games
 Mark Surge, a Hero in the Hero Factory toyline
 The Surge (video game), a video game developed by Deck13 Interactive
Surge, robot protector of Super City, a character in the mobile game Brawl Stars

Other
  Surge S1, ARM-based System-on-Chips (SoCs) developed and manufactured by Xiaomi
 Iraq War troop surge of 2007 (usually referred to as "The Surge"), the revised U.S. counter-insurgency strategy in the Iraq War
 Afghanistan War troop surge of 2010 - Increase of U.S. troops in 2010
 The Surge: A Military History
 Stuttgart Surge, the American Football franchise of the European League of Football

See also
 
 
 Surgery (disambiguation)
 Serge (disambiguation)
 Gush (disambiguation)